is a 2019 Japanese film adaptation of a manga series of the same name by Aka Akasaka. It is directed by Hayato Kawai, distributed by Toho. On February 21, 2019, Shueisha announced that a live-action film adaptation for the series is in production. The film was premiered in Japan on September 6, 2019. Sho Hirano was announced for the role of Miyuki Shirogane, and Kanna Hashimoto was announced for the role of Kaguya Shinomiya. Hayato Kawai directed the film, Yūichi Tokunaga wrote the screenplay, and principal photography was conducted for March to April 2019. The teaser visual poster was unveiled on May 3, 2019.

Plot

In the senior high school division of Shuchiin Academy, student council president Miyuki Shirogane and vice president Kaguya Shinomiya appear to be a perfect match. Kaguya is the daughter of a wealthy conglomerate family, and Miyuki is the top student at the school and well-known across the prefecture. Although they like each other, they are too proud to confess their love, as they believe whoever does so first would lose. The story follows their many schemes to make the other one confess or at least show signs of affection.

Cast
 
 Kanna Hashimoto as Kaguya Shinomiya
 Sho Hirano as Miyuki Shirogane
 Nana Asakawa as Chika Fujiwara
 Hayato Sano as Yū Ishigami
 Mayu Hotta as Ai Hayasaka
 Natsumi Ikema as Nagisa Kashiwagi
 Yūtarō as Tsubasa
 Masahiro Takashima as Miyuki's father
 Jiro Sato as Shōzō Tanuma, narrator
 Aoi Koga as Cinema Counter Girl
Amu Fukao as Kei Shirogane

Sequel 
A sequel titled  was released in theaters on August 20, 2021.

References

External links
 
  

Kaguya-sama: Love Is War
2019 films
2010s high school films
2019 romantic comedy films
2010s teen films
Japanese high school films
Japanese romantic comedy films
Live-action films based on manga
Manga adapted into films
Toho films
2010s Japanese films